Bexley North railway station is located on the East Hills line, serving the Sydney suburb of Bexley North. It is served by Sydney Trains T8 Airport & South line services.

History
Bexley North station opened on 21 September 1931 when the East Hills line opened from Tempe to East Hills. In 2000, as part of the quadruplication of the line between Wolli Creek and Kingsgrove, through lines were added on either side of the existing pair.

The station was upgraded with new lifts and new bathrooms; this was completed in October 2021.

Platforms & services

Transport links
Punchbowl Bus Company operates one route via Bexley North station:
446: Roselands Shopping Centre to St George Hospital, Kogarah via Earlwood and Bardwell Park

Transit Systems operate five routes via Bexley North station:
420 Westfield Burwood to Westfield Eastgardens via Campsie, Rockdale and Sydney Airport.
420N Westfield Burwood to Westfield Eastgardens Night service.
491: Five Dock to Hurstville via Ashfield, Canterbury and Earlwood
493: Roselands Shopping Centre to Rockdale via Beverly Hills, Bexley North and Bexley
410: Marsfield to Hurstville via Ryde, Concord, Burwood and Campsie

Bexley North station is served by one NightRide route:
N20: Riverwood station to City (Town Hall) via Narwee, Rockdale and Airport

References

External links

Bexley North station details Transport for New South Wales

Railway stations in Sydney
Railway stations in Australia opened in 1931
East Hills railway line
Bayside Council